A self-authenticating document, under the law of evidence in the United States, is any document that can be admitted into evidence at a trial without proof being submitted to support the claim that the document is what it appears to be. Several categories of documents are deemed to be self-authenticating:

Certified copy of public or business records;
Official publications of government agencies;
Newspaper articles;
Trade inscriptions, such as labels on products;
Acknowledged documents (wherein the signer also gets a paper notarized); and
Commercial paper under the Uniform Commercial Code.

Although most U.S. states have evidentiary rules similar to the Federal Rules of Evidence, the California Evidence Code diverges significantly from the FRE in that it does not treat trade inscriptions as self-authenticating.  This means that if a defendant does not stipulate to the authenticity and accuracy of a trade inscription, and the plaintiff lacks testimony from percipient witnesses who can establish a complete chain of custody leading back to the defendant, then the plaintiff must use expert testimony to establish the authenticity of the inscription and to get around the obvious hearsay issue (i.e., to establish, based on common practice within the trade, that the product is what the inscription says it is).

References

Evidence law